Penicillin on Wax is the debut studio album by American New York-based rapper Tim Dog. It was released on November 12, 1991 via Ruffhouse Records. Production was handled by several record producers, including Ced-Gee, TR Love and Moe Love from Ultramagnetic MC's, Bobby Crawford, Louis Flores, and Tim Dog himself. Fellow rapper Kool Keith made guest appearances on two tracks.

The album spawned three singles, the infamous underground hit "Fuck Compton" (which disses the West Coast hip hop), "Step To Me" and "Bronx Nigga". The album peaked at number 155 on the US Billboard 200 chart, number 34 on the Top R&B/Hip-Hop Albums chart, number 4 on the Heatseekers Albums chart.

Background
 The intro used the same beat as N.W.A's "efil4zaggin" album intro. Tim taunted "I stole your beat and made it better, to show the whole world that you ain't nothing but a bunch of pussies" before a number of disparaging answering machine messages supported Tim's position. Tim rapped: "Wearing all that black, driving them cars, but you still look wack!"
 A skit called "DJ Quik Beat Down" was a forty-second audio snippet of Tim Dog physically assaulting DJ Quik. 
 The track "Step To Me" taunted Compton rappers and included the line "DJ Quik he can suck my dick". 
 "Michel'le Conversation" was a skit where a Michel'le soundalike called Tim Dog to complain about Tim's Compton diss, but then ended up admitting she was "tired of him (Dre) beating down on me" and for Tim to "Call me when you're in town".
 The track "Goin Wild in the Penile" included an intro whereby Tim had recently been released from prison for shooting a "Compton kid".

The lyrical insults were arguably the opening salvo in what would later become the East Coast versus West Coast hip hop conflict which would ultimately lead to the "beef" between Bad Boy Records and Death Row Records.

Critical reception

AllMusic's Ron Wynn gave Penicillin on Wax an "Album Pick" tag, saying "Bronx rapper Tim Dog informed the world what he thought of West Coast types with the single "F--- Compton." It was the definitive composition on his debut album, setting the stage for a series of angry, often vicious and sneering taunts, challenges, boasts and putdowns." Entertainment Weekly writer James Bernard commended Tim's "deep and ominous" vocals for delivering "attention-grabbing moments" at times but felt the album gets weighted down with Tim's lyrical tirades against N.W.A over unspectacular beats, concluding that "Yes, "dissing" is a proud rap tradition, but such one-note obsession gets pretty boring. Move on, Tim Dog, move on." Robert Christgau cited "Fuck Compton" as a "choice cut", indicating a good song on "an album that isn't worth your time or money." In a retrospective review, DJ Fatboy of RapReviews praised the overall production throughout the album, Tim's "forceful" delivery of his absurd lyricism despite wishing he craft better lyrics and Kool Keith's guest contributions on "I Ain't Havin' It" and "Secret Fantasies", concluding that, "Great production values, utter craziness. Although it's debatable whether or not it was Tim's intent to be that fuckin out there, it's no question this was one of the most entertaining albums to come out of the early 90s, point blank."

Track listing

Personnel
 Timothy Blair – main artist, producer
 Keith Matthew Thornton – featured artist (tracks: 18, 20)
 Michael Joseph Tyler – guitar
 Jay Davidson – saxophone
 Andy "Funky Drummer" Kravitz – drums
 Cedric Ulmont Miller – producer (tracks: 4, 9, 14, 16, 19)
 Trevor Randolph – producer (tracks: 1, 8, 10, 20)
 Maurice Russell Smith – producer (tracks: 2, 10, 12, 18)
 Bobby Crawford – producer (tracks: 6, 15)
 Louis Flores – producer (track 17)
 Joseph Mario Nicolo – mixing
 Yuval Kossovsky – assistant engineering
 Francesca Restrepo – art direction & design
 Jesse Frohman – photography

Charts

Weekly charts

Year-end charts

References

External links

Tim Dog albums
1991 debut albums
Ruffhouse Records albums
Columbia Records albums